Madambi Subramanian Namboodiri is a Kathakali musician from Kerala, India. He received several noted awards including the Sangeet Natak Akademi Award, Kerala State Kathakali Award, Kerala Sangeetha Nataka Akademi Award and Kerala Kalamandalam Award.

Biography 
Subramanian Namboodiri was born in Madambi Manai in Sreekrishnapuram village of Palakkad district in 1943 to Sankaran Namboodiri and Sridevi Antharjanam.

As a child, Madambi wanted to study music and started studying music at Poomully Manai. Chembai Vaidyanatha Bhagavathar, Kongorpilli and Ramankutty Warrier were the main teachers at Poomully that time. After studying at Poomully for two months, he joined Kalamandalam in 1957 to study Kathakali music. Kalamandalam Neelakantan Nambeesan, Kalamandalam Sivaraman Nair and Kavungal Madhava Panicker were his teachers at Kalamandalam. His classmates were Kalamandalam Sankaran Empranthiri, Tirur Nambissan and Kalamandalam Hyderali. After completing 8-year course at Kalamandalam, he joined as a trainee-instructor at Perur Gandhi Sevas Sadanam for a while and then joined Kalamandalam in 1969 as Kathakali music instructor.

Madampi is an artist who has remained steadfast in the tradition of Kathakali music, and is known for his efforts to preserve the distinctive purity of Kathakali music by resisting the extreme progressivism in Kathakali music. His classmates Empranthiri and Hyderali reached the pinnacle of fame by leading great changes in Kathakali music. Although Madambi does not agree with such modifications or practices, he has the respect of all of them as unique artists.

After retiring from Kalamandalam in 1998, he settled in Cheruthuruthy, Thrissur district. He is survived by his first wife late Parvati Antharjan and children Shashi and Narayanan. After the death of his first wife, he married Arya Devi Antharjanam. They have a daughter, Sangeetha.

Awards and honors 

 Sangeet Natak Akademi Award 2017
 Kerala State Kathakali Award 2018
 Kerala Sangeetha Nataka Akademi Award 2010
 Kerala Kalamandalam Award
 Pattikkamthodi Ravunni Menon Smaraka Puraskaram

References 

1943 births
Living people
Kathakali exponents
Singers from Kerala
20th-century Indian musicians
Recipients of the Sangeet Natak Akademi Award
Malayali people
People from Palakkad district
Recipients of the Kerala Sangeetha Nataka Akademi Award